The United Nations Special Rapporteur on the Rights of Indigenous Peoples is a special rapporteur appointed by the United Nations after a 2001 mandate of the United Nations Commission on Human Rights. José Francisco Calí Tzay was appointed to the post in 2020, succeeding Victoria Tauli-Corpuz who had been in post since 2014, following James Anaya.

List of post-holders

Annual reports
Every year, the Special Rapporteur presents annual reports, usually on specific themes or issues important to the rights of indigenous peoples.

References

External links
List of reports by the special rapporteur